The Madness of Love is a 1855 historical drama play written by Manuel Tamayo y Baus.

Tracking the plight of Queen Joanna of Castile, the play consists of 5 acts set in 1506 in Castile; specifically in Tudela de Duero (Act 1), in an inn near Tudela (Act 2) and in the Palace of the Constables of Castile in Burgos (last three acts). The play premiered at the Teatro del Príncipe on 12 January 1855. It proved to be a commercial and international success. A very influential 19th-century work, it has been adapted to film several times.

References 

1855 plays
Spanish plays adapted into films
Plays set in the 16th century